The Swift Creek culture was a Middle Woodland period archaeological culture in the Southeastern Woodlands of North America, dating to around 100-800 CE. It occupied the areas now part of Georgia, Alabama, Florida, South Carolina, and Tennessee. In Florida, Swift Creek ceremonial practices and burial complexes are referred to technically as the Yent-Green Point complex. The Swift Creek culture was contemporaneous with and interacted with the Hopewell culture; Swift Creek is often described as "Hopewellian." The type site for the Swift Creek culture was the Swift Creek mound site, which was located in Bibb County, Georgia. The Leake Mounds are another significant Swift Creek Culture site in Georgia.

Swift Creek peoples practiced mound-building but were generally non-sedentary. Their sustenance resulted from hunting, gathering/collecting, and fishing. Swift Creek are characterized by earthenware pottery with complicated stamped designs, involving mostly curvilinear elements. Examples of a type of pottery decoration consisting of diamond-shaped checks found at the Swift Creek sites are also known from Hopewell sites in Ohio (such as Seip Earthworks, Rockhold, Harness, and Turner), and the Mann site in southern Indiana as well as the Crystal River Site in Florida.

See also
 Santa Rosa-Swift Creek culture
 Hopewell tradition
 List of Hopewell sites

Notes

References
Kelly, A.R., and Betty A. Smith. 1975 The Swift Creek Site, 9 Bi 3, Macon, Georgia. Ms. on file, Ocmulgee National Monument, Macon, Georgia.
Snow, F.H. 1975   "Swift Creek Designs and Distributions: A South Georgia Study", Early Georgia 3(2):38-59.
Williams, M., and D.T. Elliott, editors. 1998 A World Engraved: Archaeology of the Swift Creek Culture. University of Alabama Press, Tuscaloosa.

External links
Swift Creek Period, Frankie Snow, South Georgia College

Archaeological type sites
 
Archaeological cultures of North America
Archaeology of the United States
Woodland period